Little General may refer to:

Dick Advocaat (born 1947), Dutch football manager and former player
Garnet Campbell (curler) (1927–2011), Canadian curler
Avery Johnson (born 1965), American basketball player and coach
Stacey Jones (born 1976), New Zealand rugby league footballer
Ron Lancaster (1938–2008), an American-Canadian football player and coach
Allan Langer (born 1966), Australian rugby league footballer
Óscar Pareja (born 1968), a Colombian professional football manager
Aimé Picquet du Boisguy (1776–1839), a French chouan general during the French Revolution
Lars-Erik Sjöberg (1944–1987), a Swedish ice hockey player
Frederick Traill-Burroughs (1831–1905), a British Army officer
Andre Turner (born 1964), an American basketball player

See also 
Eddie LeBaron (1930–2015), American quarterback known by the nickname "Littlest General"